Bharat Kaul is an Indian actor mainly known for villainous and antagonistic roles in Bengali films. He has also appeared in Hindi films.

Filmography

Television

References

External links

21st-century Indian male actors
20th-century Indian male actors
Male actors in Bengali cinema
Bengali male television actors
Living people
Year of birth missing (living people)